Zinc finger protein 521 is a protein that in humans is encoded by the ZNF521 gene.

References

Further reading